LPS-responsive beige-like anchor protein deficiency is a rare genetic condition caused by the absence of LPS-responsive beige-like anchor protein (LRBA).

Signs and symptoms

The presentation of this condition is variable making the diagnosis difficult. The most common features include
 Immune dysregulation (95%)
 Organomegaly (86%)
 Recurrent infections (71%)
 Hypogammaglobulinemia (57%)
 Granulomatous lymphocytic interstitial lung disease (38%)

There is also a tendency to develop inflammatory bowel disease.

Genetics

The LBRA gene is located on the long arm of chromosome 4 (4q31.3).

Pathogenesis

LBRA protein interacts with the protein CTLA4. The absence of LBRA increases the turnover of CTLA4 and interferes with vesicle trafficking.

Diagnosis

Differential diagnosis
 Common variable immunodeficiency
 IPEX syndrome

Management

Along with treatment for infections and other complications several additional treatments have been tried. These include hematopoietic stem cell transplantation, immunoglobulin replacement and immunosuppressive treatment.

History

This condition was first described in 2012.

References

External links 

Syndromes
Autosomal recessive disorders
Genetic diseases and disorders
Rare diseases